Penance (Monet Yvette Clarisse Maria Therese St. Croix) is a mutant superheroine appearing in American comic books published by Marvel Comics, primarily in association with the X-Men. Created by writer Scott Lobdell and artist Chris Bachalo, she first appeared in The Uncanny X-Men #316 (Sept. 1994). She was originally a member of the teenage mutant group Generation X (1994), and later X-Factor and X-Men. Monet is a Muslim superhero and has illustrated the struggle of accepting "different" people central to X-Men stories.

Powers and abilities
Monet is superhuman in essentially all aspects, possessing superhuman strength capable of lifting automobiles, boulders and other massive objects.  Monet also possesses superhuman physical attributes like invulnerability, agility, dexterity, speed, quick reflexes, and balance. X-Men Bishop noted that Monet possesses a "superior rating" in all human physical categories. She is virtually invulnerable, being able to withstand common firearms at long range and direct blows from Hulk. Similar to Hulk's healing powers, Monet can heal and recover from wounds faster, and is more resistant to toxins, disease, and even aging. Among Monet's other abilities are telescopic vision, night vision and acute hearing abilities.  

Monet has Eidetic memory and intuitive skills, proving this trait by rerouting one of Arcade's robots to track the signal back to the source without knowing the exact specifications of this robot. She is able to psionically levitate and move herself in the air by force of will, allowing her to fly at supersonic speeds approaching Mach 3. She has demonstrated minor telekinetic capabilities in the past, deflecting bullets  or projecting thought waves as a concussive force. 

Monet is a telepath with the ability to read minds, project her thoughts into the minds of others, and defensively mask her mind against telepathic intrusion. She has limited offensive capabilities, such as mind control and the ability to manipulate the memory of others. The range of her telepathy is limited to within a few feet of herself. Monet also has the ability to view mutant auras.

Monet and her siblings are able to merge into different combinations with different powers, although merging seems easiest for the twins Nicole and Claudette.

Monet is formidable in hand-to-hand combat and is of genius level intellect.

Citizenship 
Monet holds citizenship in Algeria, Bosnia, and France. Monet's father is the Monégasque ambassador to France, making it very likely that Monet is a Monacan citizen.

Penance

Hollow (formerly called Penance) is a character associated with the St. Croix family who first appeared in Generation X #1 (November, 1994), and was created by Scott Lobdell and Chris Bachalo. It is a mindless body in which three members of the St Croix family, all members of the superhero team Generation X, have been trapped in for some time. Hollow has red skin and rarely speaks.

The powers of the different hosts/prisoners of the Penance form vary, but the hollow Penance form's powers are diamond-hard skin and extended sharp claws on their fingers, toes, and hair follicles. Due to the density of the skin, it is durable and resistant to psychic intrusion. Hollow also possesses animalistic agility, as she usually moves around by crouching and padding and leaping on all fours; she has been shown on occasion to use her feet to grab and grip objects and people.

Hollow appeared as a supporting character in Avengers Academy, beginning with issue #21 (Jan 2012), making occasional appearances throughout the series.

The original creative team behind Generation X, Scott Lobdell and Chris Bachalo, intended Penance to be a girl called Yvette from Yugoslavia.  This was never directly revealed in the comic and links to Monet St. Croix were made by the subsequent creative team.

Fictional character biography

Early life
Monet St. Croix was born in Sarajevo, Bosnia during a family ski trip and is the second child of the rich and eccentric Afro-Monégasque Cartier St. Croix and his Algerian wife. Cartier was the son of the French aristocrat Louis St. Croix. She grew up pompous and spoiled as a result of being the favored child of her father with his prestigious position as the Monégasque Ambassador to France. She was also raised as a Muslim. Shortly after her mother's mysterious death, her brother Marius, the vampiric mutant known as Emplate, was banished from the St. Croix home. He eventually returned after learning the dark arts and requested that Monet join him in conquering another dimension. She rejected his offer, and after finally having enough of his sister's ridicule, Marius transformed her into a red-skinned, untouchable mute creature whom he nicknamed Penance. Monet's younger sisters, Nicole and Claudette, heard the commotion and investigated; when they could not find Monet, they assumed that Marius had killed her. The twins then banished him to another dimension while Monet followed, believing it was her only way to revert to normal.

Afraid their father would break down after the loss of his favorite child, the twin sisters decided to merge bodies and replicate Monet. This version of Monet would have been identical to the original if it were not for Claudette's autism which would sometimes take effect, leaving "Monet" in catatonic stupors. Subsequently, while the twins were impersonating their sister, they were among the new generation of mutants captured by the techno-organic alien race known as the Phalanx.

Generation X
While impersonating Monet, the twins battled the Phalanx until she and the other teenage mutants were rescued by Banshee and Emma Frost. The group soon formed the Generation X team, with Sean and Emma acting as co-headmasters of the new school designed to train them in the use of their powers. Shortly after the school opens, Banshee, Synch, and Jubilee go to the airport to welcome new students Chamber. The twins remain at the school and are reunited with the Australian teleporter Gateway, who they are glad to see and address as "Mentor". However, Gateway's return serves to warn them of the return of their evil brother. The twins convince Gateway to teleport them, Husk, Skin, and Emma Frost to the airport, where Emplate has already managed to absorb the powers of Chamber and Banshee. Though the twins recognize Emplate and address him as such, he says he cannot determine their name (despite the aspect of his mutant power that grants him "knowledge at a glance" with mutants, including their name, and more or less allowing him to read their memories). In addition, Emplate knows for a fact they are not Monet, as the true Monet has been his prisoner and main source of sustenance for years.

Rather than face the full might of Generation X, Emplate decides to retreat. The twins try to stop him from fleeing but are forced to stop telepathically by Emma, who saw Husk seriously wounded in the battle and desired to keep "Monet" from meeting a similar fate. The twins are furious at her interruption and warn her never to enter their minds again. Shortly after returning to the school, Gateway reappears on the front lawn, this time with the true Monet (having found her during the aforementioned battle, as Emplate returns to his hideout to find her gone), who is still trapped in the Penance body. Gateway utters a single word: "Penance", and this is assumed to be the unfortunate girl's name by the others.

The moment Penance wakes up, her overriding desire is to be free. She instinctively slashes through anything in her way with her razor-sharp claws to achieve this goal and escapes onto the school grounds. The twins immediately display both a detailed knowledge of Penance's plight (specifically her connection to her former captor, Emplate) far beyond even her teachers, as well as a curious reluctance to physically engage the girl. While the rest of the team scrambles to try and capture Penance by force, Chamber merely lets her come to him, sensing that their mutant powers have made them both monsters and kindred spirits. Penance calms down in his presence, bringing the crisis to a peaceful end.

The team soon becomes aware of Monet's reoccurring, temporary trances, where she "spaces out" and is typically unresponsive for several minutes at the least (due to Claudette's autism). Monet later mentions (to the reader) that this most often happens during moments of intense focus. Worse, as she is the only member of the team with actual super-strength, she proves completely unmovable until she emerges from the trances. An early occurrence of this trance state forces Synch, Skin, and Jubilee to abandon her during a trip to New York City, where they end up battling and defeating Hemingway of Gene Nation. Monet eventually wakes up and reunites with the team, just in time to save Jubilee and Leech from being crushed by a falling slab of debris. Though Jubilee is grateful, she later points out that Monet would be a major liability if she ever spaced out in battle. Monet brushes aside her concern, and continues to do so virtually any time her trances are mentioned in the near future.

During the Generation X Annual '95, the team is introduced to Cordelia Frost, Emma's younger and even less trustworthy sister, and her constant companion, the mutant Mondo, who is able to absorb both organic and inorganic matter, taking on its properties, as well as transport himself through these same materials. Mondo eventually joins the team, while Cordelia leaves. At the same time, Jubilee discovers and accidentally rips Monet's diary, which more closely resembles a children's coloring book. Penance later has something resembling a seizure while swimming with Jubilee, forcing Emma to give her psychic equivalent of a sedative. Penance remains unconscious in the medical wing for the next two issues, with Jubilee as her most constant visitor.

Almost immediately after Chamber saves the team from a near-fatal attack by Omega Red (Penance wakes up at some point between issues 11 and 12), they are again attacked by Emplate, who desires to have Penance returned to him. This time, Emplate has recruited a team of Hellions to do his dirty work—all of whom are under his thrall, including Gayle Edgerton, Chamber's former lover who was paralyzed when his powers first manifested. Gayle helps Emplate because she wants revenge on Chamber, but once Generation X is captured, he betrays her. Monet is the last to be captured, and Emplate reveals the first of several St. Croix family secrets to Generation X: that Monet is actually his younger sister. However, he does not reveal to them that the twins have fused to become Monet, though it is clear from his choice of words that he is now aware of this as well. Monet manages to escape and contact the X-Men for help before the Hellions find her. The X-Man Bishop arrives to assist Monet. He is disturbed upon learning of Monet's relation to Emplate and reveals that hordes of "Emplates" will be a source of great trouble in the future.

Meanwhile, Jubilee manages to enrage Emplate into absorbing her genetic marrow, knowing that because she cannot control her powers when she is angry, neither can Emplate. The resulting explosion of pyrotechnics frees Generation X, and Emplate flees with Penance, though it is unclear if she was taken against her will. They re-emerge before Monet and Bishop, and Bishop immediately tries to kill Emplate to spare the future from his taint. Penance confronts Monet, torn between killing her and helping her. Monet does not resist, hoping her death will atone for their brother's sins. Upon hearing this, Penance attacks Emplate, which shocks him into retreat. However, he reveals that he has converted Synch into his minion, and transported him to his hometown of St. Louis to feed on his own family and friends. The team manages to stop Synch, though it is Monet who ultimately defeats him by daring him to truly synch with her. Whatever Synch finds inside her horrifies him and shocks Emplate's influence out of him, leaving only more questions in the team's minds about what else Monet may be hiding.

While the rest of the Marvel Universe was occupied with Onslaught, Emma, sensing the disturbance, tried to protect Generation X by taking over their minds, gently but firmly forcing them to accompany her to her home. While this did indeed protect them from Onslaught, it also left them basically defenseless against Toad, who Emma had allowed to live in her home. To correct this oversight, Nicole projected herself into Emma's mind for the first time (Emma of course mistook her for a younger Monet), explaining the situation so that Emma would release the team and talk sense into Toad.

Following this adventure, Generation X comes to the attention of Bastion of Operation: Zero Tolerance. For the time being, Bastion takes special notice of Chamber, Banshee, and Emplate, and their disastrous first meeting at the airport. Bastion eventually figures out Chamber's identity, and upon learning that Chamber's plane ticket was purchased by Frost Enterprises, gradually comes closer to exposing Generation X's (and more importantly, the X-Men's) secrets.

Monet enters one of her trances during a xenobiology midterm given by visiting professor Beast. Penance ventures into the classroom via the window and attempts to sit for the test, and though she only manages to shred her test paper, Emma considers it a plus that she is at least trying to fit in. Beast is fascinated when Monet re-emerges from the trance, having built a detailed origami structure out of her test paper. Beast reveals to Sean and Emma that Monet's trances likely have nothing to do with her mutant power, as they first thought. Instead, he recognizes the signs and says Monet is autistic. Though Sean and Emma discuss treatment options and try to talk Monet into seeing a doctor, she abruptly destroys the school's cars on the scheduled date and refuses to go. Sean chases her into the sky, where she tearfully describes having been poked and prodded by numerous doctors as a child, and begs him not to make her go through that again. Sean agrees, though Emma insists that Monet simply manipulated him to avoid the problem yet again.

Emplate appears while Monet, Husk, Jubilee, and Emma spend the Christmas holidays at the St. Croix home in Monaco. He only reveals himself to Monet, and his presence seems to trigger in her the ability to view mutagenic auras, just as he does. Emplate invites Monet to join him, and failing that, asks her to find someone to take his place in the dimension where he is constantly torn apart. Monet cannot imagine condemning anyone else to such a fate, and Emplate vanishes into a sea of white hands that tear at his flesh.

Generation X is then attacked by the team of Sean's cousin Black Tom Cassidy and Mondo, who undergoes a fearsome transformation in appearance and attitude, having been shown waiting for Tom's signal (over the course of several issues) to reveal his true nature. Black Tom's plant manipulation completely transforms the school grounds, and he forces Sean and Emma to fight each other to the death in front of the captured team while Mondo captures Jubilee, who managed to evade them. Bastion finds Jubilee first, and protects her by killing Mondo, but then takes Jubilee hostage and transports her to his desert base in New Mexico. Emma uses her powers to force Sean to unleash his sonic scream, supposedly killing her in the process. Sean is rescued by Penance, who slices Tom in half with a single blow.

Having discovered that the captured team was actually merely empty husks, Sean sets out to find Generation X. Unknown to him, they have been transported to a tiny island in the ocean. Monet and Chamber try to protect their teammates, but the sheer hopelessness of the situation causes Monet to panic, and she attempts to fly away and get help, but soon exhausts herself and falls into the ocean. Synch pulls her back onto the island, but Monet has lost all hope. Emma recovers and searches Sean's mind, helping him realize where the team is. Oddly enough, the team suddenly finds itself on a rusty ship at sea where their dreams seem to have been realized: Chamber's body is restored and he is dating Husk, Synch and Jubilee are in love and run a camp for kids, and Emplate is restored to the kind brother that Monet once knew. Skin, however, is tied to a pole because he will not make a request of Glorian, the Dream Shaper who rescued the team. He eventually convinces Glorian to send the team home, though Glorian assumes this means Skin's home of Los Angeles and sends the team there. Sean realizes that Black Tom planned to send the team to the sentient island Krakoa.

M/Penance/M-Twins
 Skin leads the team through East L.A. in search of his cousin Gil. Monet inexplicably becomes very childlike and playful while at Venice Beach, but only Angelo seems to find this odd. Skin's ex-girlfriend Tores, tipped off by Operation: Zero Tolerance that he had faked his death, furiously corners the team with her gang at Gil's house in hopes of killing Skin. Prime Sentinels soon destroy the house, with Generation X, Gil, and Tores barely escaping in time and fleeing into the sewers. Meanwhile, Sean, Emma, and Penance intercept a distress call from the X-Men, who have been shot down by Operation: Zero Tolerance, and head to Emma's home in Miami in disguise. They are met by Emplate's henchman D.O.A., who arranges a deal: Emplate will reveal Monet's location (and thus the team's location), but in exchange for Penance.

Sean flat out refuses, but Emma knocks him out with a psi-bolt and proceeds with the deal. In L.A., Monet notices Chamber being purposely distant to Husk (because he suspects Skin and Husk are growing closer) and advises him to correct his mistake, which Chamber does. Monet also notices Synch having regrets, as there are many things he may never do if they die in the coming battle. He asks for permission to kiss Monet, and she agrees on the condition that it "doesn't count if we don't die", and kisses him first, leaving him stunned.

Back in Miami, Sean wakes up in time to punch Emma and calls for Penance, who instantly frees herself from Emplate's grasp, giving Sean a clear shot with his sonic scream. Though Emma desperately claims she wouldn't have really gone through with the deal, Sean does not believe her, tells her to stay away from the kids and the school, and leaves with Penance. During the battle against the Prime Sentinels in L.A., Tores briefly displays the mutant ability to harness psychic energy and direct it as a weapon. Generation X launches an ambush, but is quickly overwhelmed. Synch and Monet are wounded, and she urges him to synch with her invulnerability so he can survive the next wave of attacks, which he has never done before. As he does so, Synch glimpses Monet's true nature, calling her "M&M" just before the attack. As planned, Gil then sets off a huge explosion to destroy the hideout and the Sentinels. Synch emerges from the rubble first, using his aura to locate Monet. Instead, he finds Nicole and Claudette, each in a coma and separated for the first time since joining the team as Monet. However, the secret of where the real Monet was would remain a mystery to the team.

Soon after Emplate returned to terrorize the young mutants, the twins merged with Emplate, creating a new persona, called "M-Plate". When the three of them separated, the twins finally learned what their brother did to the real Monet St. Croix. Everett managed to convince Nicole to finally reveal the truth to the rest of the team. Immediately after Nicole's story, the twins formed back into "M" and then merged with Penance, freeing Monet in the process.

Returning to normal, the traumatized M became self-reliant and outwardly harsh and defensive to make up for her fear and insecurity, causing her to clash with many of her Generation X teammates. The only person she allowed to see her vulnerabilities was Everett Thomas, with whom she started a brief romantic relationship. A rivalry soon started with her teammate Jubilee, which only intensified after Monet and Everett became an item. When Emplate returned during the school dance, Jubilee caused an explosion, which, once again, separated the twins from each other, and left the Penance body to become its own being.

When the twins leave for their home, they take the now-empty Penance body with them, along with the young mutants Artie Maddicks and Leech.

Upon hearing the return of the twins, Cartier St. Croix decided to visit his three daughters. Coming face to face with his severely injured son Marius, Cartier apologized to him. Marius then revealed that he was the one responsible for the death of his mother, further infuriating Monet.

Monet was then transferred to an exclusive boarding school in the Swiss Alps. The school was burned down during a battle with its headmaster (a vampire) and M chose to return to the Massachusetts Academy.

Final days of Generation X

When Monet returned, she and Everett continued to grow close and began to intensify their relationship. However, Monet was the most devastated when Synch sacrificed his own life to stop an exploding bomb that had been placed in the academy by Emma Frost's sister, Adrienne. After the tragic incident, the team rapidly began to fall apart, even as Monet began to open up and act more vulnerable around her teammates. Monet also began to observe Emma acting strangely villainous. After they found out Emma had killed her sister in retribution for Everett's death, the entire team questioned Emma's leadership abilities, particularly when combined with Banshee's relapse into alcoholism following the death of his lover, Moira MacTaggert. The school was promptly closed when the students decided their instructors were no longer fit to teach them.

X-Corps/X-Corporation
After Generation X disbanded, M temporarily joined Banshee's militant X-Corps with Husk and Jubilee to keep an eye on the devastated Irish mutant. However, the X-Corps were soon destroyed by Mystique, leaving M to join the X-Corporation's European branch, located in Paris, where she assisted Cannonball, Multiple Man, and Siryn in defeating Weapon XII. Monet helped the X-Men battle Black Tom Cassidy and the Juggernaut before returning to her duties at X-Corporation Paris.

X-Factor Investigations
Following the events of House of M and the shutdown of X-Corporation, M, who also has appeared on the cover of Vanity Fair, has opted to join X-Factor Investigations, a private detective agency run by Multiple Man. Monet completed her first mission on the team by telepathically tricking the famous actor Jack Vaughn to confess to the murder of Gloria Santiago's sister. Afterwards, Monet broke down crying in Jamie Madrox's arms, but quickly threatened to break him in half if he ever revealed her moment of "weakness". A comment made to Rictor seems to imply she no longer wishes to go by the name M. However, in a therapy session with Doc Samson, Monet stated that she hides behind the "M" persona so that others will not see how vulnerable she has become after the lengthy time she was held captive by her brother.

Monet also had a brief romantic fling with Madrox. The tryst did not end well because Madrox was unsure whether he or his duplicate had slept with Monet while he or his duplicate slept with Siryn at the same time. While the two women initially refused to speak to each other, they eventually took a shopping trip to patch things up after being threatened by Layla Miller. During this Paris trip, the two encountered a small anti-mutant mob marching on Paris' own Mutant Town, and were arrested by the Gendarmes for breaking the riot up. However, in a French prison, the mob leader bragged to Siryn and Monet that he and his mob had succeeded in burning down the building, which was why he had been arrested. In response, Monet crucified the mob leader before she and Siryn broke out of the prison to check on the ex-mutants. When the two arrived, they found an abandoned girl whom Monet decided to take back to the States.

World War Hulk
When the Hulk came to the X-Mansion to capture Xavier over his part in the Hulk's banishment from Earth, Monet and the rest of X-Factor came to help. During the fight, she said to the Hulk that she was virtually invulnerable, and he responded by kicking her to New Jersey.

Messiah Complex
M has a small role during Messiah Complex. She is seen along with the rest of the X-Teams and has a talk with Warpath about his feelings concerning his late friend Caliban and being a member of X-Force. Later, she aids Emma and the Stepford Cuckoos in locating the baby. She is present at the final battle on Muir Island.

Divided We Stand
M buys all the women of X-Factor Investigations an iPhone, but destroys Rahne's when she finds out she is leaving. She tells Rahne about how she is always telling her to feel and claims that since Layla is not coming back, she will keep her iPhone in mint condition until Rahne returns to X-Factor. She leaves, telling Rahne to not be a stranger, or stranger than she already is. She then goes to a bar with Siryn where Theresa reveals she is pregnant. Monet offers to be with her if she chooses to get it aborted, only to be told she is not taking that option. M also states that Theresa has embryos more mature than Jamie, and that "he would make a crap father." Later Siryn tries to tell Jamie of her pregnancy, but Monet realizes Siryn still loves Jamie.

Secret Invasion
X-Factor is employed by the estranged father of former teen X-Man Darwin to locate him. Monet, Guido, and Jamie find Darwin traveling with Longshot, who is later revealed to be a Skrull. The trio also come into conflict with She-Hulk and Jazinda, who are in pursuit of said Skrull. For some reason, She-Hulk gets very angry around Monet. After he is captured, the groups go their separate ways and reunite Darwin with his father. Monet is oblivious to the fact Darwin has a crush on her.

Operating out of Detroit & return to New York City 
Shortly after the events of Secret Invasion, Darwin's father sells him out to a group of people called the Karma Project. While he is in a coma, Monet is called in to read his father's mind only to find nothing. Later the real Longshot shows up to help and Monet shows an attraction to him, though it is unknown whether it's Longshot's ability of having women fall in love with him or not. She then teams up with Madrox, Strong Guy, and Longshot in finding Darwin and is present at the birth of Sean.

Val Cooper sends Monet, Guido, and Darwin to acquire a shipment of weapons designed to take out mutants, though instead they sink it to the bottom of the ocean. Monet later falls under Cortex's mental control and proceeds to attack her teammates until they are attacked by three Sentinels from the future. Monet is freed from Cortex's control by Longshot and when she attacks Cortex, she discovers that he is the second Madrox duplicate who was sent to the other future timeline during "Messiah Complex."

In the aftermath of the battle with Cortex, X-Factor unofficially splits due to tensions between Jamie and Terry. Guido and Madrox move back to New York while Monet, Darwin, and the others stay in Detroit to work under Terry. However, the Detroit team soon crumbles when a depressed Terry chooses to disband the team and move back to Ireland. Monet chooses to move in with Terry to keep an eye on her. Monet worries for her friend, who becomes increasingly withdrawn and even has a brief sexual fling with her former boyfriend Deadpool.

Unsure of how to help Terry, Monet visits the team in New York in an attempt to get Jamie and Terry to work their problems out. However, upon arriving back at X-Factor headquarters, Val Cooper informs Monet that her father Cartier has been kidnapped by a terrorist cell that will behead him unless Monet surrenders herself to them.

Monet and Guido eventually travel to South America to confront the kidnappers, only to have their plane shot down. Monet awakens in an illusion where she is led to believe that she is once again transforming into Penance. It is revealed that the mastermind behind the kidnapping is Baron Mordo, who plans to feed off Monet to combat his cancer.

After Strong Guy is resurrected by Layla Miller at the cost of his soul, Guido having no restraints, kisses Monet. Monet attempts to discuss what happened between them before being attacked by Rahne and Shatterstar's pursuers.

Monet becomes scared of Guido not having a soul and calls him a freak. She also gets into a heated argument with Theresa (Siryn/Banshee) about her not letting go of people's death.

Monet becomes enraged after seeing Madrox alive, thinking that Layla was responsible for his resurrection. She slams Layla into a brick wall, then flies off with her into the New York skyline. Madrox tells Terry to fly after them, but Terry says that if Monet really wanted to hurt her, she would have done it right there. Monet drops her off at the Empire State building and scares the tourists away so she and Layla can have words. Monet says to Layla that she always knows what's going on. Layla states that this is not the case, and didn't resurrect Jamie. She uses the telescope as an example of her not knowing every event as the events get closer and then blackout. Layla then tells Monet that Guido was supposed to have died and not Jamie. She states she wanted to change fate so Monet wouldn't blame herself for Guido's death which would have resulted in her going through a year-long depression. She wanted to spare Monet pain, who, according to Layla, will eventually become her best friend. After hearing all this, Monet leaves Layla so that she can have some space and collect her thoughts.

Monet was shown to be dying from a serious brain injury when she fought Pluto, God of The Underworld, where he mercilessly beat her to near death until Wolfsbane's son intervened and killed Pluto. Later in a fight with Strong Guy, M died due to the brain injury, but is subsequently resurrected by Guido when he becomes Lord of Hell.

After the Hell On Earth Saga, Monet finds Darwin in Las Vegas. They have drinks at a bar, and he questions her where her soul went to after she died. Annoyed by the singer, she approaches him and explains that there is no heaven, but only nothingness or Hell. Darwin finally admits his feeling towards her only to be rejected. As Darwin leaves the bar, Monet aggressively corners him on wall, and tells him that she needs to feel something after her experience with death. The two end up having sex with one another. Darwin knows that Monet is not mentally prepared for a relationship, but is happy to be there.

X-Men vol. 4
Monet has returned to The Jean Grey Academy after her event with X-Factor, to try to make sense on what to do with her life. Jubilee, her old teammate is surprised to see her again. She then meets Karima Shapandar and immediately forms a friendship with her due to both of them having an experience with death. Lady Deathstrike and her team see her jogging with Monet, and attempt to ambush them. During the confrontation, Karima is shot, and Monet manages to protect her temporarily, until Monet gets caught off guard. Before Deathstrike could finish her attack, Karima shoots and injures Lady Deathstrike causing her to retreat to regroup and get more intel. Monet explains to the X-Men that Lady Deathstrike's consciousness is now in the body of a teenage Latina named Ana Cortes. Storm asks Monet to help them figure out what her plan is. Monet, true to fashion thinks about herself stating that she's just there to take some downtime and is not interested in becoming the team's new bruiser. Jubilee, infuriated, says to Monet that Storm isn't asking. Monet agrees to help due to the fact that she feels guilty about Karima taking a bullet that she feels she should have stopped.

All-New, All-Different Marvel
In the wake of the M-Pox crisis, Monet joined Magneto's team of X-Men, with the goal of protecting mutantkind at any cost. During this time, she developed a love-hate relationship with the reformed Sabretooth, whom she frequently teased. They bickered so much that Psylocke tells them to just get a room, prompting Monet to ask if she was jealous.  While investigating a mysterious illness and series of abductions that befell the Morlocks M and her teammate Sabretooth ran afoul of Emplate. She tried to distract him long enough so he would fade away, but as he did, he managed to possess M, cursing her with the hunger he suffered. Having been with her on the mission, Sabretooth was aware of what happened & later visited Monet in her room to tell her that her secret is safe with him & that she could feed on him whenever she needed.

During a war between Inhumans and the X-Men, M and Sabretooth became part of the mutants who guarded over the Inhumans sent to captivity in Limbo. M began to feed on the Inhumans instead, wanting revenge & blaming them for the death of Madrox by releasing the T-Mist into the air. A fight broke out when Sabretooth tries to stop her, but at the end of the issue, he is willing to let her kill the last Inhuman to keep her curse secret. Sabretooth eventually ran away with her to help her contain Emplate's possession and find a cure.

Generation X, Vol. 2
After somehow getting separated from Sabretooth, M continues hunting mutants to feed off of and ends up hiding out by the Xavier Institute, now located in Central Park, New York. After the X-Men discover that someone's been hunting mutants and draining their powers, Jubilee's students decide to take matters into their own hands and hunt the perpetrator but end up caught in M's ambush. Jubilee arrives to save her students, and upon seeing her old friend, M temporarily regains control of herself and immediately retreats.

Monet hides out in an abandoned subway car, where D.O.A. brings in Morlocks for her & Emplate to feast on. Emplate warns M that Morlocks are not enough, and they need stronger mutant marrow to remain anchored to their plane of existence. M declares she's looking for a more permanent solution to their problem.

M-Plate attacks the Xavier Institute, going after the students. She has D.O.A. use his abilities to disconnect the school from the outside world, cutting off any possible interference. The original teammates, Chamber, Husk, and Jubilee all fight M-Plate and are soundly defeated -Jubilee almost being killed by having her amulet torn off and thrown into the sunlight to burn. Thanks to the timely save of Quentin, he uses his Phoenix shard to cure Jubilee's vampirism & returning her mutant powers.

M-Plate, having absorbed Hindsight's powers earlier now has his ability of seeing the memories of whomever she touches. Bling comes up with the plan and touches M-Plate, the latter seeing her past. This freaks out Monet, with Emplate telling her to get a hold of herself. Bling gets word to the other previous Generation X team, and they all combine their efforts and grab a hold of M-Plate. Monet is panicked, with Jubilee apologizing to her & saying she needs to remember. All the memories of her time with the team come flooding back, which eventually breaks Emplate's hold on her, separating the two & finally curing Monet. Marius fades away to his own dimension and Monet is taken to the infirmary with the injured students. Jubilee watches after her, with Monet insisting that she's fine & just needs a manicure & a blowout. The two have a chat and Monet is her usually snarky self, with Jubilee smiling and complaining that she was almost happy Monet was back.

Weapon X-Force
Sometime after the events of Generation X, Monet fell under the mind-control of Mentallo and joined Stryker's cult, The Church of Human Potential. She lured Weapon X-Force there so she could share the gift with Sabretooth. She's freed from Mentallo with the aid of Deathstrike & teams up with Sabretooth's Weapon X-Force to take down the cult -even going into the depths of Hell to kill Stryker for good.

During this final mission, she & Sabretooth reconnect with Domino, Deathstrike, Omega Red, and Deadpool believing them to have feelings for each other. It's revealed Sabretooth left M while she was possessed by Emplate and has regretted it for a while since she was one of the few to treat him decently after his inversion. Monet doesn't blame him due to how much of a monster she became but Sabretooth still felt guilty despite her understanding. He wants t her to know something, but is interrupted before he can tell her. Sadly, things end tragically before the truth can be revealed.

Sabretooth is lost in battle facing a power-boosted Mentallo. Being overwhelmed by the former, Mentallo shot him with Domino's discarded gun, sending him into the blade machine as the final sacrifice in Stryker's resurrection. This devastated Monet, who screamed for him as he was sliced to pieces. Monet was present with Weapon X-Force during Graydon's resurrection. Mystique says Sabretooth is responsible, but Monet sadly asks what happened to Sabretooth.

The Loners
When Ricochet breaks into a building holding women being used to harvest Mutant Growth Hormone, he meets an assassin named Delilah. During the fight, one of Ricochets discs break open a chamber and Penance emerges. At first confused as to where she is, Penance tries to convince Ricochet that she isn't a threat, though he is forced to avoid her claws. Lightspeed (following Ricochet out of concern) lands between the two and uses her Kymellian powers to mesmerize Penance, but when she places her hand on Penance's shoulder, she stabs Lightspeed through her shoulders. Later, Penance encounters the rest of the group at the hospital where Julie is recovering. It is then she senses a kindred spirit in Phil Urich. She is followed by the ones intent on imprisoning her, including a mysterious woman named Fuyumi Fujikawa who calls her "Hollow". Mickey Musashi's makes a deal with the woman that allows Hollow to remain with the group, and which allows her to stay at Phil's residence.

House of X
M is later seen living on the sovereign nation of Krakoa constructed by X as the new mutant homeland for him and his people. She was amongst a host of heavy hitter X-Men selected to take the fight to the Orchis Group before they could bring the abominable Mother Mold online, whilst on their way to the Orchis Forge from their lunar base the team was met with heavy resistance by their opposing force.

After their ship was believed to have been dispatched by the Forge's armed forces, Husk and Archangel were found dead on arrival. The rest of the team went to work while Monet stayed behind with Jean to set up a telepathic relay for everyone to keep in contact with one another. The vessel they were on was eventually boarded and M shoved Jean out an escape pod while fighting to the death with Orchis's soldiers in her Penance form.

At a later date, thanks to The Five, who merged their collective power together to resurrect Monet as well as Warren, Jean, Scott, Paige, Logan, Raven and Kurt with help from a Cerebro empowered X. Monet was more than happy to be back amongst the living but was hesitant to receive a hug from Storm, the six heroes were well received by their fellow mutants back home; hailed as saviors of the highest caliber after giving their lives for preserving their newfound way of life.

Claudette and Nicole St. Croix have re-appeared as members of the new mutant nation of Krakoa, they were shown at the Akademos Habitat both turned into Penance, they were being reprehended by their sister Monet.

Reception
 In 2014, Entertainment Weekly ranked M/Penance 72nd in their "Let's rank every X-Man ever" list.
 In 2018, CBR.com ranked Lady Penance 18th in their "Age Of Apocalypse: The 30 Strongest Characters In Marvel's Coolest Alternate World" list.

Other versions

Age of Apocalypse
Monet never made a proper appearance in the harsh world known as the Age of Apocalypse. A girl referred to in the book as "Claudia" (which may be one or the two merged St. Croix twins) was known as Know-It-All and was part of Generation Next, having merged herself with the team's computer system. She risked her life to search the databases of Apocalypse, a task which ended in her destruction at the hands of the Shadow King.

Claudette along with Nicole also appeared working alongside their brother in Apocalypse's Elite Mutant Force, going by the name "The Monets".

Age of Apocalypse took place before Scott Lobdell, Monet's creator, left the X-books. His original intention for the character of Monet was for her to only be a fake persona used by the M-Twins when they were joined. The appearances of Know-It-All and her sister in the Monets were intended as clues towards Monet's true nature in the regular continuity.

After the fall of Apocalypse and the ascension of Weapon Omega to power as the new Apocalypse, he began resurrecting deceased Alpha mutants. The operation was interrupted by Prophet, however, who stopped most of the resurrections with the exception of Monet's. The connection between Know-It-All and Monet seems to have been abandoned by Marvel, at least for now.

After returning to life, Monet renamed herself as Penance and began rallying mutants to her cause which was to seek forgiveness for their past crimes and to rebuild their world. She was soon approached by the servants of Weapon Omega–Azazel, Prelate Summers and Colossus–who asked her to meet Weapon Omega to discuss how she could service the citizens under him. Penance refused and used her telepathic powers to restore Colossus' memories, which caused him to side with her. She attempted to do the same for Cyclops but failed and was blasted for her troubles, leading to a fight breaking out between Colossus and Cyclops. Azazel agrees to leave and takes Cyclops with him, promising to return.

Penance is immediately approached by Prophet, the leader of the human resistance who reveals that it was he that resurrected her in hope that she would aid them and that she would be more open-minded than Weapon Omega. Azazel returns with Weapon Omega, who has come to see her kneel before him, which she does. Just as Weapon Omega leaves, the Human Resistance arrives with Sugarman. Penance promises to be in touch with Prophet.

X-Men: The End
In the alternate future in the X-Men: The End series written by Chris Claremont, M is a member of the XSE and a critical part of the hastily marshalled forces attempting to defeat Mister Sinister.

In other media

Film
 Penance appears in the television film Generation X, portrayed by Amarilis. This version displayed no psionic powers.
 In X2: X-Men United, Penance's name appears on a file while Mystique is going through the files on William Stryker's computer.

References

External links
 World of Black Heroes: Monet Biography
 
 Marvel Universe Character Bio Wiki
 Uncannyxmen.net Spotlight On...M

Black people in comics
Characters created by Scott Lobdell
Characters created by Chris Bachalo
Comics characters introduced in 1994
Muslim characters in comics
Muslim superheroes
Fictional models
Fictional private investigators
Marvel Comics characters who have mental powers
Marvel Comics telekinetics
Marvel Comics telepaths
Marvel Comics characters who can move at superhuman speeds
Marvel Comics characters with accelerated healing
Marvel Comics characters with superhuman strength
Marvel Comics martial artists
Marvel Comics mutants
Marvel Comics female superheroes
Fictional Bosnian people
X-Factor (comics)